Ochle  is a village in the administrative district of Gmina Koło, within Koło County, Greater Poland Voivodeship, in west-central Poland.

The village has a population of 310.

Famous people from Ochle:
Kazimierz Rusek (1922-2011)

References

Ochle